Ek Gunah Aur Sahi is an Indian Hindi film which was released in 1980. It starred Sunil Dutt, Parveen Babi and Madan Puri. The film was produced and directed by Yogi Kathuia.

Cast

Sunil Dutt as Shankar 
Parveen Babi as Paro
Madan Puri as Mr. Verma

Music
Lyrics: Jan Nisar Akhtar

External links 
 

1980 films
Films scored by Jaidev
1980s Hindi-language films